Maria Devigili  is an Italian guitarist / singer / songwriter/ videomaker and musician from Trento, Trentino-Alto Adige, Italy.

Early life
Maria started her professional career as a musician in the 2009, when she left her job as press officer in a software house and devoted herself entirely to music.

Since her childhood she had composed many songs but had never played in a club or officially released a record. 

So as a teenager she entered the world of work, initially working only during the summer season, then after she turned 20 she began working permanently to pay the rent and to support her studies at the University of Philosophy in Trento and then the specialization in Verona.

In those years she never stopped making music but she limited it to her spare time and rather secretly.

Around 2004 Maria, under the stage name Reiniku, decided to join the online sharing platform for musicians named MYSPACE. As Reiniku, she put many of her pieces online and for the first time she came into contact with many other Italian and international musicians and started new collaborations.

In the end of 2008, Maria Devigili started to embrace the idea of dedicating herself to the world of music but the work activities to pay rent and the university specialization attendance still took a large part of her time.

Towards the end of 2008 pushed by a friend, one late evening under the arcades of Piazza Maggiore in Bologna she played some of her songs on the street for the first time.

When a passenger left her 5 Euros in the case, Maria realized that perhaps she could make her songs and pay the rent at the same time.

The beginnings of busking and life on the road
And so, in 2009, she left her job to begin to dedicate herself entirely to music, first by doing street concerts and immediately afterwards club shows. She also stopped her studies at the university, focusing all of her time and energy on her new career.

In that time she was living between Bologna, in the north center of Italy considered "the music city", an open-mind environment, full of artists, and another city Trento her family's town, a smaller and quiet town not too far from Germany. Famous for the Council of Trent.

At the same time, she was participating in numerous contests for emerging songwriters, both local and national.

From the beginning Maria immediately attracted attention in the local scene of Trento to being a female musician playing alone in the street but also to have left her normal job to become a musician pro. When she was asked the question in an interview for a local contest for emerging artists "What is jour job? she answered: "I'm a musician, I play my songs in the street to pay my rent".  

What shocked the public was also the fact that she was a female musician playing her songs in the streets or in some bars all over Italy, using just the train as a means of transportation and without any roadie support. At the time in Italy it was very rare to even hear about female singer-songwriters and especially in the small town of Trento.

For this reason, even before releasing her first official record, in 2011 Maria was already a name in the local scene and often on the newspapers and even on the local TVs.

From the Premio Pavanello to the release of the first EP

In early September 2010,  Maria Devigili won the national contest for young songwriters "Premio Pavanello"  [https://www.pressreader.com/italy/corriere-del-trentino/20100907/281827165087874  "
The prize was the production of an EP with the label Gulliver Studio Production, which culminated with her first official record release, La Semplicità, the 20 November 2011

2012: The change of the sound and Motori e Introspezioni

In early 2012 Maria Devigili bought her first electric guitar. Before that she had played only classical or acoustic guitars. 
The change in her sound became evident in her first album Motori e Introspezioni. 
Essentially based on her raw electric guitar sounds and the percussions of Stefano Orzes.

The album was recorded in June 2012 at the Igloo Audio Factory in Correggio (Reggio Emilia)   during the days of the 
Northern Italian Earthquakes.

Motori e introspezioni contains the cover of Franco Battiato's song  "Aria di Rivoluzione" and the musical adaption 
of the poem "L'Albatros" by Charles Baudelaire.

The album was recorded and arranged by Andrea Sologni of Gazebo Penguins 
and it was released in the autumn of 2012 with the digital distribution by The Orchard and Audioglobe.

The second album: the increase in notoriety in the Italian indie scene

During the summer of 2014, Maria Devigili launched an online fundraising campaign for the production of her second album La Trasformazione.

The campaign was launched on the digital platform Music Raiser. The platform was founded by Giovanni Gulino, leader of the historical alternative Italian band Marta sui Tubi and the dj and producer Tania Varuni.

The campaign was successful and during the autumn Maria recorded the album in Bologna at the Studio Spaziale  with the audio engineering Enrico Baraldi and Rettura.
During the recordings time the indie label Riff Records propose to be part of the production and of the release of the album with the distributor partner Good Fellas and the publisher Buzz Supreme. The album was released in March 2015. RIFF Records Release.

The album features the important Italian songwriters, Claudio Lolli, and Francesca Bono of the indie rock band Ofeliadorme and it was released in March 2015.

The promotional launch of the second album of Maria Devigili was handled by the press agency Fleisch whose roster is composed by the most quoted Italian alternative rock bands; like Afterhours and Verdena.

In April 2015 Maria entered the contest Bologna Palco Aperto.
A contest dedicated to the memory of Roberto "Freak" Antoni, leader of Skiantos. The art director of the contest was the Italian singer-songwriter Eugenio Finardi.

Maria won the first prize which consisted of playing on the Workers' day Festival on May 1 in Piazza Maggiore in Bologna. On that occasion, Maria came in contact with Giuvazza,  guitarist and producer of Finardi, with which she began a collaboration.

Their first works together materialized after some months with the production of the song Inconsapevoli on which Giuvazza did the artistic production. They proposed the song to the popular contest Sanremo Giovani (Sanremo Young) but the song was not selected.
Giuvazza did the artistic production of other subsequent songs of the songwriter and which are found in her third album Tempus Fugit.

In the autumn of 2015 Rockit, an Italian music fanzine, put Maria Devigili in a special list of 10 most interesting Italian female indie singer-songwriters.

The 2017 American Release of La Trasformazione video was subsequently accepted for the Grammy 2018 First Round Ballots.

Musicians and collaborations

From 2009 to the present day Maria has had a very intense concert activity preferring minimal live sets and solo or duo. 
During the most part of 2010, she was on tour with the double bass player Giovanni Cannata, which collaborated for many years with the famous Italian theatrical actor and artist Moni Ovadia.

During the first months of 2011 Maria was on tour with the poly-instrumental player Osman Meyredy now living in Amsterdam and active in several bands like the famous Zappa tribute band Zappatika.

From 2011 and 2017, Maria Devigili played in duo with Stefano Orzes, painter and drummer active in several indie bands in Italy from the end of the Nineties until now. Bands like The Crazy Crazy World of Mr Rubik and with Giorgio Canali Rosso Fuoco.

2020 and COVID-19
From January 2020 until July Maria was stranded in Las Vegas Nevada USA due to travel restrictions in place for the coronavirus.
An unwitting expat, several Italian media outlets requested interviews with Maria from her American perspective on the COVID-19 situation.

Even American press took an interest in Maria's work. Here is an article from OnStage Magazine from April 7, 2020 by Kath Galasso.

New Works
On 5 June 2020 Maria Devigili released her new single "Io, tu e le cose" about the taboo topic of the menstrual cycle.

She composed the song during January 2019 for a female's music initiative named "il Festivalino di Anatomia Femminile" (the "Little Festival of Female Anatomy" ) created by the Italian journalist and music critic "Michele Monina".

Leading up to the festival he asked Maria and a group of other indie female songwriters to compose a song about the "female body". A project to be presented at Sanremo in February 2019 during the days of the Music Sanremo Music Festival  a very popular song contest held in the city since 1951.

Publications in Italy and America are seeing her most recent projects as a huge leap forward artistically.

Radio and Television

Starting February 2021 thru June 2022 Maria Devigili was the creator and host of "Ecce Cantautrice", the first radio broadcast about female singer-songwriters in Italy. The program was broadcast  on Radio Tandem, an historic Bolzano radio station that has been very important in regards to the struggles for civil rights, feminism and bilingualism.

During the spring of 2022 Maria Devigili was contacted to participate in the new TV program about street artists, "Dalla Strada al Palco". The show was hosted by Nek and airs in prime time on Rai 2 during June and July 2022.

Theater and Stage

Since 2011 she makes the music of the theatrical reading "Un Viale da Mezzanotte all'Una" of Pietro Laino, with the actress Annalisa Morsella

Awards and recognition
'PREMIO PAVANELLO AWARD 2010' 
 (2010)

Her reward was the production of her first EP La Semplicità with the label Gulliver Studio Production with the audio engineer Alessandro Battisti.

Discography
"Volare" (2022)
(Las Palmas Records) Single

"La Rivoluzione Indolore" (2021)
(Cardio Productions) Single

"Marte" (2021)
(Riff Records) Single

"Io, tu e le cose" (2020)
(Self Produced) Single

"Tempus Fugit" (2018)
(Riff Records / Cardio Productions) Album

"La Trasformazione" (2015)
(Riff Records / Goodfellas) Album

"Motori e Introspezioni"
(2012)(Audioglobe) Album

"La Semplicità" (2011)
(Gulliver Productions) 2011 EP

Endorsements
Maria Devigili is endorsed by the following music brands.

"Zt Amplifiers"

"Stefy Music - Danelectro"

"Stefy Line Bags and Straps Factory"

References

Year of birth missing (living people)
Living people
Italian women singer-songwriters
Italian women guitarists
21st-century Italian women singers
21st-century Italian guitarists
21st-century women guitarists